Muhammad Ibrahim (born January 7, 1955) is a Lebanese actor, radio actor and voice actor.

Filmography

Film 
 The Suspect (2009)

Television 
Dr. Hala - Nadeem. 2010
Sarah. 2008
Izz ad-Din al-Qassam - Salem. 1999
Laugh and Cry. 1997
The Third Man. 1985
Shawl of Spring - Fuad. 1985

References

External links 

1955 births
Living people
Lebanese male actors
Lebanese male television actors
Lebanese male radio actors
Lebanese male voice actors
20th-century Lebanese male actors
21st-century Lebanese male actors